The Privolzhskaya Railway (Приволжская железная дорога; "Volga Railway") is a subsidiary of the Russian Railways headquartered in Saratov. It serves the Saratov, Volgograd, and Astrakhan regions of Russia. Its three branches are headquartered in Saratov, Volgograd, and Astrakhan. The railway route length totals 4236,8 km. The network has 31 146 employees (as of 2009). A short stretch of the railway crosses the territory of Kazakhstan. It was established in 1953 by the merger of the Stalingrad Railway and Ryazan-Uralsk Railway and was recently extended to Olya, a port on the Caspian Sea.

The route is part of the North-South International Transport Corridor to Moscow and Kazakhstan.

References

External links 

 
 Official website

Railway lines in Russia
Rail transport in Saratov Oblast
Rail transport in Volgograd Oblast
Rail transport in Astrakhan Oblast
1953 establishments in the Soviet Union